The YF-73 was China's first successful cryogenic liquid hydrogen fuel and liquid oxygen oxidizer gimballed engine. It had four hinge mounted nozzles that gimbaled each on one axis to supply thrust vector control and was restart capable. It used cavitating flow venturis to regulate propellant flows. The gas generator also incorporated dual heat exchangers that heated hydrogen gas, and supplied helium from separate systems to pressurize the hydrogen and oxygen tanks. The engine was relatively underpowered for its task and the start up and restart procedures were unreliable. Thus, it was quickly replaced by the YF-75.

History
In October 1970 the Beijing Aerospace Propulsion Institute was tasked with developing a  prototype rocket engine burning liquid hydrogen and liquid oxygen. They settled on a pump-fed gas generator design. The prototype was successfully fire tested for 20 seconds on January 25, 1975. In March of the same year, China officially initiated the Project 311 do initiate the engineering work on the first Chinese cryogenic engine, which was named YF-73. It had its debut on April 8, 1984, when it sent the first geosynchronous communications satellite experiment, the Dong Fang Hong 2 to geosynchronous orbit. It flew 13 times with 3 failures and was last used on May 26, 2000.

References

External links
 Encyclopedia Astronautica
  Go Taikonauts - An unofficial Chinese Space Website

Rocket engines using hydrogen propellant
Rocket engines of China
Rocket engines using the gas-generator cycle